Marco Antonio Pogioli, known as Marco (born 9 June 1975) is a retired Brazilian footballer who played in Finland for FC Jazz, FC Haka and KuPS Kuopio.

He played seven seasons and 148 caps scoring 39 goals in the Finnish top division Veikkausliiga between 1997 and 2003. Marco ended his career playing for KuPS in the Finnish second tier in 2004. In 1997–98 UEFA Champions League second qualifying round match he scored twice for FC Jazz against Feyenoord.At present he lives in a city in the interior of the state of Paraná called Maringa in southern Brazil. I work in the automotive branch of Vehicle Sales Manager.ref>Football Database</ref>

Honours 
Finnish Championship: 2000

References 

1975 births
People from Maringá
Brazilian footballers
Brazilian expatriate footballers
Expatriate footballers in Finland
Veikkausliiga players
FC Jazz players
FC Haka players
Kuopion Palloseura players
Living people
Association football forwards
Sportspeople from Paraná (state)